The singles tournament for the 1988 Taipei Women's Championship was a 32-draw with qualifiers.

Anne Minter was the defending champion but did not compete that year.

Stephanie Rehe won in the final 6–4, 6–4 against Brenda Schultz.

Seeds
A champion seed is indicated in bold text while text in italics indicates the round in which that seed was eliminated. The top five seeds received a bye to the second round.

  Catarina Lindqvist (semifinals)
  Patty Fendick (semifinals)
  Stephanie Rehe (champion)
  Brenda Schultz (final)
  Elizabeth Smylie (second round)
  Hester Witvoet (second round)
  Belinda Cordwell (quarterfinals)
  Silke Meier (first round)

Draw

Final

Section 1

Section 2

References

 1988 Taiwan Open Draw sheet at WTA Tennis

1988 Singles
1988 WTA Tour
1988 in Taiwanese tennis